Franciscus Christian van der Veen (25 March 1919 – 4 May 1975) was a Dutch football forward who played for the Netherlands in the 1938 FIFA World Cup. He also played for Heracles Almelo winning the Dutch championship in 1941.

References

External links
 

1919 births
1975 deaths
Dutch footballers
Netherlands international footballers
Association football forwards
Heracles Almelo players
1938 FIFA World Cup players
Sportspeople from Almelo
Footballers from Overijssel